Terence Abernethy (born 23 August 1930) is a South African former cricketer, who played for Transvaal in first-class cricket.

References

1930 births
South African cricketers
Living people
Cricketers from Pretoria